Jeanette (or Jeannette, Jeannetta or Jeanetta) is a female name, a diminutive form of the name Jeanne. Other variations are Janette and Janet. The name is derived from the Hebrew "God is gracious".

Notable people 
 Jeanette (Spanish singer) (born 1951), Spanish singer
 Jeanette Antolin (born 1981), American gymnast
 Jeannette Armstrong (born 1948), Canadian author
 Jeanetta Arnette (born 1954), American actress
 Jeanette Aw (born 1979), Singaporean actress
 Jeanette Berglind (1816–1903), Swedish sign language pedagogue 
 Jeanette Biedermann (born 1980), German singer and actress
 Jeannette Bougrab, French lawyer and politician.
 Jeanette Dyrkjær (1963–2011), Danish nude model and adult actress
 Jeannette Escanilla (born 1961), Swedish politician
 Jeannette zu Fürstenberg (born 1982), German businesswoman and aristocrat
 Jeannette Gadson (1945–2007), New York politician
 Jeanette Granberg (1825–1857), Swedish playwright
 Jeanette Guysi (1873–1966), American painter
 Jeannette Lee, British music record executive
 Jeannette H. Lee (formerly Jeannette Lee White), American entrepreneur
 Jeanette Lee (born 1971), American professional pool player
 Jeanette Loff (1906–1942), American actress and singer
 Jeanette MacDonald (1903–1965), American actress and singer
 Jennette McCurdy (born 1992), American actress
 Jeanette DuBois Meech (1835–1911), American evangelist and industrial educator
 Jeanetta Calhoun Mish (born 1961), American poet 
 Jeannette Ng, Hong Kong-born British fantasy author
 Jeanette Oppenheim (born 1952), Danish lawyer and politician, MEP
 Jeannette Rankin (1880–1973), American social worker, first woman elected to the United States Congress
 Jeannette Walls (born 1960), American writer
 Jeannette Walworth (1835–1918), American novelist, journalist
 Jeanette Wässelius (1784–1853), Swedish opera singer
 Jeanette Winterson (born 1959), British novelist

Fictional characters
 Jeannette (comics), a fictional banshee in the DC Comics Universe
 Jeanette Miller, one of the Chipettes in Alvin and the Chipmunks
Jeanette Turner is one of the two main protagonists of Freeform's 2021 miniseries Cruel Summer

French feminine given names